Robert Locke may refer to:
Rob Locke (born 1971), British actor
Robert H. Locke aka Clayton Bess (born 1944), writer and playwright
Robert R. Locke (born 1932), American historian and management expert
Bobby Locke (1917–1987), golfer
Bobby Locke (baseball) (born 1934), baseball player

See also
Robert Lock (disambiguation)